Ilya Nikitin is a Russian swimmer who won a silver medal in 2002 FINA World Swimming Championships in Moscow, Russia for 4x200 metre freestyle.

References

Living people
Medalists at the FINA World Swimming Championships (25 m)
Date of birth missing (living people)
Year of birth missing (living people)